Montel Gibson (born 15 December 1997) is an English footballer who plays as a forward for AFC Telford United on loan from Ilkeston Town.

He has previously played professionally for Notts County and Grimsby Town. Having started his career with County he went on to play at Non-League level for Romulus, Barwell, Hednesford Town, Sutton Coldfield Town, Ilkeston Town, Redditch United, Bedworth United, Halesowen Town, Altrincham and Stourbridge.

Playing career

Notts County
Gibson began his career as a youngster for Highgate United before being signed by League Two side Notts County following some impressive displays at Highgate United during the 2015–16 season, Montel made his debut for the club on 12 April 2016 in a home League Two 1–0 victory against Hartlepool United, coming on as an 81st-minute substitute for matchwinner Jon Stead. Montel went onto make a further 3 League Two substitute appearances in April 2016, a 5–0 away defeat to Mansfield Town, coming on again for Jon Stead on the 63rd minute, a 3–1 away defeat to Barnet, coming on for Izale McLeod on the 62nd minute, and a 2–1 home defeat to Cambridge United coming on for Alan Smith on the 74th minute.

For the 2016–17 season, manager John Sheridan decided to give Montel some time out on loan. The first loan move came on 18 August 2016, when he joined Romulus

Gibson's second loan came on 7 October 2016, when he joined Barwell on a months loan, and made his debut on 10 October 2016 against Nantwich Town and received the man of the match award for his performance.

Montel was again loaned out during the 2016–17 season, this time to Hednesford Town on 2 December 2016.

Montel returned from his loan from Hednesford Town, and made his final appearance for Notts County in an away League Two 2–0 defeat to Grimsby Town. Montel again coming on as a substitute on the 70th minute for Jonathan Forte.

Gibson's last loan of the season came on 17 February 2017 with Sutton Coldfield Town, he joined alongside teammate Dominic Brown-Hill on a youth loan.

On 16 May 2017 Kevin Nolan announced the Notts County retained list, Montel's contract had expired, he was offered a chance to gain a new contract in pre-season, however this never came to fruition, and he left the club.

Ilkeston Town
In July 2017 Montel signed for the newly formed Ilkeston Town, teaming up with manager Steve Chettle, and a full new first team squad.

Following regular appearances for Ilkeston Town, it was confirmed that Gibson had left the club on 11 March 2018. Steve Chettle suggested that difficulty traveling from Birmingham was the main reason for the departure.

Redditch United
On 16 March 2018 Gibson was signed by Tim Harris for Redditch United.

New Redditch United manager Paul Davis gave Gibson a contract for the 2018–19 season, which he signed on 15 June 2018, along with teammates Jamie Ashmore, Luke Keen and Max Loveridge.

Bedworth United
On 19 November 2018 Gibson moved to fellow Southern League Premier Central side Bedworth United. He made his debut the following day in a home fixture against Tamworth, and hit the ground running, by scoring on his debut, giving his side the lead on the 36th minute, however Tamworth went onto win the match 4–1.

Gibson scored his second goal for Bedworth in a home fixture against Leiston on 15 December 2018, scoring after 2 minutes in a 2–2 draw. He added his third goal to his goalscoring tally on 19 January 2018, in a home fixture against AFC Rushden & Diamonds, which the away team won 3–1.

Grimsby Town 
Gibson was signed by Ian Holloway for EFL League Two side Grimsby Town in August 2020 on a three-year contract. He scored his first goal for the club in an EFL Trophy tie against Harrogate Town on 8 September 2020. On 1 March 2021, Gibson joined National League side Altrincham on a one-month loan.

On 22 March 2021, Gibson caused controversy when he broke Covid-19 lockdown rules in which he posted a video to social media from a gender reveal party he was hosting for his unborn child. The video caused anger amongst Grimsby supporters and his manager Paul Hurst, in response Gibson apologised to the fans, his manager and the club. Following on from Grimsby's relegation from the Football League at the end of the 2020–21 season, Gibson was deemed surplus to requirements and was transfer listed with the player being made available on a free transfer.

On 2 July 2021, Gibson joined Stourbridge on a loan deal to run through until January 2022.

On 9 November 2021, Gibson was released from his contract by mutual consent. He was fifteen months into his three-year contract.

Stourbridge
Gibson continued with Stourbridge and on his first game following his release he scored both goals in a 2–1 win away at Carlton Town in the FA Trophy.

On 17 January 2022, Gibson announced via his Twitter account that he had left Stourbridge and was now a free agent.

On 18 January 2022, Stourbridge announced they had terminated the contracts of Gibson and teammate Jak Hickman due to their refusal to play in the FA Trophy fourth round tie with Guiseley. Gibson reacted to the club's announcement, stating the club had refused his and Hickman's request to attend trials at professional clubs, but stated despite this that he had never refused to play in the Guiseley game.

Return to Ilkeston Town
On 25 January 2022, Gibson rejoined Northern Premier League Division One Midlands side Ilkeston Town on an 18-month contract.

AFC Telford United (loan)
On 27 September 2022, Gibson signed for National League North club AFC Telford United on loan until the end of the 2022–23 season.

Career statistics

References

External links

1997 births
Living people
English footballers
Footballers from Birmingham, West Midlands
Association football forwards
Highgate United F.C. players
Notts County F.C. players
Romulus F.C. players
Barwell F.C. players
Hednesford Town F.C. players
Sutton Coldfield Town F.C. players
Ilkeston Town F.C. players
Redditch United F.C. players
Bedworth United F.C. players
Grimsby Town F.C. players
Altrincham F.C. players
Stourbridge F.C. players
AFC Telford United players
English Football League players
Southern Football League players
National League (English football) players